Basra, nicknamed Basra al-Hamra (Basra the Red), is an archaeological site in Morocco. It was originally a summer capital of the Idrisid dynasty from the 8th to 10th centuries.

It is situated on the road from Souq al-Arba to Ouezzane, about 40 km from the Atlantic coast and 20 km south of Ksar el-Kebir.

It was named after the city of Basra in Iraq. The geographer and traveller Ibn Hawqal in the 9th century described it as a flourishing commercial centre. The main productions were cotton and cereals. The red earth fortifications which gave it its nickname were destroyed in 979 but the city lingered on. By the time of Leo Africanus it was in ruins.

References

Sources
D. Eustache, "Al-Basra, capital idrisside et son port". Hespéris XLII, 1955, 217–238. An important study.
Ahmed Siraj, L'Image de la Tingitane. L'historiographie arabe medievale et l'Antiquite nord-africaine. École Française de Rome, 1995. . pp 558–565 discusses various problems connected with the archaeology and historiography.

External links
 Moroccan government web page for the site

Archaeological sites in Morocco
Idrisid dynasty
Buildings and structures in Tanger-Tetouan-Al Hoceima